Okamura (written: 岡村 lit. "hill village") is a Japanese surname. Notable people with the surname include:

 Akemi Okamura, Japanese voice actor
 Allison Okamura, American roboticist
 Arthur Okamura, American silk screen artist
 Chonosuke Okamura, Japanese amateur paleontologist who won the Ig Nobel Prize.
 Gerald Okamura, Hawaiian martial artist
 Hiroki Okamura, Japanese badminton player
 Hiroshi Okamura, Japanese mathematician
 Homare Okamura, Japanese singer and model
, Japanese field hockey player
, Japanese-American professional wrestler
 Kintarô Okamura (1867–1935), Japanese botanist
 Michio Okamura, Japanese game developer
 Sota Okamura, Japanese ski jumper
 Takashi Okamura (comedian), member of the comedy duo Ninety-nine
 Takashi Okamura (photographer), Japanese photographer
, Japanese gymnast
 Tomio Okamura, entrepreneur, writer and Czech far right populist politician
, Japanese cross-country skier
 Yasuji Okamura, general of the Imperial Japanese Army
 Yoshiyuki Okamura, Japanese manga artist

See also
 Okamura Island in the Inland Sea, part of the city of Imabari, Japan

Japanese-language surnames